Dabha may refer to the following places in India :

 Dabha, Gujarat, a village on Sauarashtra peninsula
 Dabha State, a former princely state of Kathiawar with seat in the above town
 Dabha, Maharasthra, a village in Hingna taluka